Ngāti Rangi or Ngāti Rangituhia is a Māori iwi (tribe) of New Zealand. Contemporary settlement is mainly around Waiouru, Ohakune, and the Upper Whanganui River in the central North Island. The iwi's area of interest extends north from the Paretetaitonga peak of Mount Ruapehu, west to the Pukupuku Stream, east to the meeting of the Moawhango and Aorangi waterways, and south to the Haumakariri Stream. Ngāti Rangi trace their ancestry to Paerangi. They believe they were in New Zealand before the first migrations from Hawaiki.

Pepeha (tribal saying)

Ko Ruapehu te maunga

Ko Ngā Turi o Murimotu te maunga tapu

Ko Whangaehu te awa

Ko Ngāti Rangi te iwi

References